A sacrificial part is a part of a machine or product that is intentionally engineered to fail under excess mechanical stress, electrical stress, or other unexpected and dangerous situations. The sacrificial part is engineered to fail first, thus breaking the serial connection and protecting other parts of the system downstream.

Examples
Examples of sacrificial parts include:
 Electrical fuses
 Over-pressure burst disks
 Mechanical shear pins
 Galvanic anodes
 Pyrotechnic fastener
 Fusible plug
 Some leader lines used in angling

See also 
 
 
 

Mechanical engineering
Safety equipment

References